Karie is a given name and a surname. Notable people referred to by this name include the following:

Given name
Karie Murphy, is a political activist
Karie Ross (born 1958/9), sports broadcaster

Surname
Kahimi Karie (born 1968), Japanese musician
Sharif Karie (born 1978), American middle-distance athlete

See also

Kare (surname)
Karre
Karrie
Carie Graves
Kare (surname)
Kari (name)
Kariel
Kariem Hussein
Karien
Karim
Karin (given name)
Karle (name)
Karve (surname)
Kyrie (given name)